Madama Europa was the nickname of Europa Rossi (fl. 1600), an opera singer, the first Jewish opera singer to achieve widespread fame outside of the Jewish community.

She was the sister of the Jewish violinist and composer Salamone Rossi who is known to have been employed at Mantua from 1587 to 1628.

She probably took her name from appearances in the mythical role of Europa in an intermezzo before 1600 at the court of the Dukes of Mantua.

She probably died with her brother in the War of the Mantuan Succession, when, following the fall of Mantua to the Austrian troops of the Holy Roman Empire, imperial soldiers sacked the Jewish ghetto.

References

1630 deaths
17th-century Italian women opera singers
16th-century Jews
Jewish opera singers
Year of birth unknown
16th-century Italian women singers